"Buffalo Gals, Won't You Come Out Tonight" is a science fiction novelette by American writer Ursula K. Le Guin, originally published in the November 1987 issue of The Magazine of Fantasy and Science Fiction and collected in Buffalo Gals and Other Animal Presences. The title is borrowed from the song "Buffalo Gals" where the first line of the chorus is "Buffalo gals, won't you come out tonight?"

It won the Hugo Award for Best Novelette and the World Fantasy Award for Best Novella in 1988, and was nominated for the Nebula Award and the Theodore Sturgeon Award.

It was re-published in 1994 by Pomegranate Artbooks with illustrations provided by Susan Seddon Boulet.

Plot summary
A lost child tumbles into the confusing world of Southwestern US desert folklore and lives for a while with the trickster Coyote.

References

External links
 

Hugo Award for Best Novelette winning works
Science fiction short stories
Short stories by Ursula K. Le Guin
World Fantasy Award for Best Novella winners
Works originally published in The Magazine of Fantasy & Science Fiction
1987 short stories